Qatrani may refer to:
 Getrani
 Qatrani-ye Olya Yek
 Qatrani-ye Sofla Yek